Jo Daviess may refer to:

Jo Daviess County, Illinois, United States
Jo Daviess Township, Faribault County, Minnesota, United States
Joseph Hamilton Daveiss, American soldier and namesake of both the county and township

See also
Jo Davis (disambiguation)
Joe Davies (disambiguation)